Sirajul Islam is a politician of Chittagong District who was the Member of Parliament of Chittagong-10 constituency.

Career 
Islam was elected a Member of Parliament from the then Chittagong-10 constituency as a candidate of the Bangladesh Nationalist Party in the second parliamentary elections of 1989 and the fifth parliamentary elections of 1991.

References 

People from Chittagong District
Bangladesh Nationalist Party politicians
5th Jatiya Sangsad members
2nd Jatiya Sangsad members
Year of birth missing (living people)
Place of birth missing (living people)